Buddleja incana is a species of shrub or tree in the family Scrophulariaceae. It is native to the Andes.

Description
Buddleja incana is a dioecious tree or shrub, 4 – 15 m tall, the trunk < 50  cm at the base, the bark brownish and furrowed. The branches are subquadrangular and tomentose, and form a rounded crown. The coriaceous leaves are mostly oblong, 7 – 21 cm long by 1 – 5 cm wide, the upper surface glabrescent, often bullate or rugose, the lower white or yellowish tomentose. The yellow to orange paniculate inflorescences have 2 – 3 orders of leafy-bracted branches bearing heads 1 – 1.5 cm in diameter, each with 15 – 40 flowers, the corollas 3 – 4 mm long. Ploidy: 2n = 76.

Distribution and habitat
Buddleja incana is present in Bolivia, Peru, Ecuador and Colombia, growing in canyon bottoms along streams at elevations of 2,700 – 4,500 m.

Vernacular names
Buddleja incana is called kiswar in Quechua, kiswara in Aymara, quishuar in Spanish.

Uses
The leaves are used in folk medicine against toothache and as diuretic.

References

External links

incana
Flora of South America
Trees of Bolivia
Trees of Peru
Trees of Ecuador
Trees of Colombia
Dioecious plants